The Zielfahrzeug 68 ("Target tank 68") was a decommissioned Panzer 68, which was converted to the target vehicle role. A total of ten of these vehicles were in use.

Conversion 
The Swiss Army ordered from the company Eidgenoessische Konstruktionswerkstaette "K + W Thun" ten of these vehicles, which were produced between 1972 and 1974. The turret was removed and replaced by a steel tower with additional welded steel plates. Wheels and tracks came from the Panzer 61. The tracks were protected by easily replaceable steel side protection plates, which were fixed with screws. As extra protection, steel aprons were attached on the side. The surface was provided with a welded-steel thickening, the drivers hatch was strengthened and provided with 360 ° slotted sights. The whole tactical equipment was removed, under the tower a platform made from aluminum was installed. The tower had a hatch of the same type as the driver's hatch. The tank was usually only used with one crew member, the driver, although there was enough space for an observer or a commander. Tower and driver positions were connected, so in case of a jammed driver's hatch, the driver could exit the tank through the hatch in the tower.

Concept of operations 

The target 68 tanks were used as moving target for the training firing of the anti-tank guided weapon "M47 Dragon" American-made anti-tank missile. The vehicles carried the identification numbers (M-numbers) "M77870" - "M77879" and were from 1974 to 2007 in the service of the Swiss Army. The tank with the number "M77876" was stationed on the shooting range Les Rochat and is now in the Military Museum Full. The vehicles were driven usually by members of the Army motor vehicle park (civilian employees of the Military), not from Military tank troops. It was used together with the Mowag 4x4 armored reconnaissance vehicle (armored dummy)
    
Consumption = 200 L/100 km road, 440 L/100 km off road

References 
 Book Urs Heller: Die Panzer der schweizer Armee von 1920 bis 2008 
 Military Museum Full AG Switzerland

External links 
 
  German language Specifications of the Zielfahrzeug 68
 armeemuseum.ch  
 Action shots from privately owned Panzer 68 and 61

Military vehicles of Switzerland
Post–Cold War main battle tanks
Main battle tanks of Switzerland
Main battle tanks of the Cold War